Mister 880 is a 1950 American light-hearted romantic drama film directed by Edmund Goulding and starring Burt Lancaster, Dorothy McGuire and Edmund Gwenn, about an amateurish counterfeiter who counterfeits only one dollar bills, and manages to elude the Secret Service for ten years. The film is based on the true story of Emerich Juettner, known by the alias Edward Mueller, an elderly man who counterfeited just enough money to survive, was careful where and when he spent his fake dollar bills, and was therefore able to elude authorities for ten years, despite the poor quality of his fakes, and despite growing interest in his case.

The film was based on an article by St. Clair McKelway that was first published in The New Yorker and later collected in McKelway's book True Tales from the Annals of Crime & Rascality.

Edmund Gwenn, who played the title role, won a Golden Globe Award and was nominated for an Academy Award for his performance.

In real life, Juettner was caught and arrested in 1948, and served four months in prison. Juettner made more money from the release of Mister 880 than he had made in his entire counterfeiting career.

Plot

Steve Buchanan and his boss discuss their longest running case, case 880, which only involves fake one dollar bills, each with a self-evident mistake: Washington is spelled "Wahsington". Out of respect for their perpetrator they nickname him Mister 880. The counterfeit notes passed by him are called "880s".

Buchanan goes back to the original first case, but is stretching people's memories.

He begins to suspect a woman, Ann Winslow, rather than a man, and starts dating her to find out more. But early in the investigation she is told he works for the Secret Service. She is interested in him romantically but leads a lot of false clues linking to her potentially being a counterfeiter. They fall in love. Steve is offered a job in France as forgery of dollars there is also on the increase. He decides to turn it down: partly due to Ann, and partly due to the unresolved case 880.

However, it is Ann not Steve who works out who Mr 880 is: her elderly friend "Skipper". She is very fond of Skipper and does not wish to see him go to prison.

When eventually caught, Skipper stands trial, but oddly Steve asks the judge for leniency. The judge could pass a sentence of 15 years but instead gives him 9 months. After a little debate this is amended to a year and a day as only sentences over a year are eligible for parole. This allows him to be paroled after 4 months. He is also fined one dollar... but all he can find in his pockets are forgeries so Ann offers to pay.

Cast 
 Burt Lancaster: Steve Buchanan
 Dorothy McGuire: Ann Winslow
 Edmund Gwenn: "Skipper" Miller
 Millard Mitchell: "Mac" Mc Intire
 Minor Watson: Judge O'Neil
 Hugh Sanders: Thad Mitchell
 Howard St. John: Chief
 James Millican: Olie Johnson
 Billy Gray: Mickey (uncredited)
 Larry Keating: James F. Lee (uncredited)
 Fess Parker: Fighting criminal (uncredited)

Awards and nominations
 Nominated – Academy Award for Best Supporting Actor (Edmund Gwenn)
 Golden Globe Award for Best Supporting Actor – Motion Picture (Edmund Gwenn)
 Nominated – Edgar Award for Best Mystery Screenplay (Robert Riskin)

References

External links
 
 
 

1950 films
Films directed by Edmund Goulding
1950 comedy films
American comedy films
Comedy films based on actual events
Films based on newspaper and magazine articles
Films with screenplays by Robert Riskin
20th Century Fox films
Films featuring a Best Supporting Actor Golden Globe winning performance
Counterfeit money in film
American black-and-white films
1950s English-language films
1950s American films